Sing It Loud is the thirteenth studio album by k.d. lang, credited to k.d. lang and the Siss Boom Bang, and was released on .

Track listing
All songs written by k.d. lang and Joe Pisapia unless otherwise noted.
"I Confess" (lang, Daniel Clarke, Joshua Grange) – 4:25
"A Sleep with No Dreaming" – 3:31
"The Water's Edge" – 3:53
"Perfect Word" – 4:41
"Sugar Buzz" – 5:14
"Sing It Loud" (Pisapia) – 5:25
"Inglewood" – 3:30
"Habit of Mind" (lang, Clarke, Grange) – 4:13
"Heaven" (David Byrne, Jerry Harrison) – 4:10
"Sorrow Nevermore" (lang, Clarke, Grange) – 3:33

14-track version exclusive to kdlang.com includes:

<li>"Reminiscing" (Graeham Goble) – 3:45
<li>"I Am the Winner"  – 2:26 
<li>"Hollywood Kids" – 3:53
<li>"Hungry Bird" – 4:42

Release history

Charts

Weekly charts

Year-end charts

Certifications

References

External links

2011 albums
K.d. lang albums
Nonesuch Records albums

it:Sing it Loud